The first season of Switched at Birth, an American drama television series, began airing on ABC Family on June 6, 2011, and concluded on October 22, 2012, after 30 episodes.

The one-hour scripted drama revolves around two young women who were switched at birth and grew up in very different environments. While balancing school, jobs, and their unconventional family, the girls, along with their friends and family experience deaf culture, relationships, classism, racism, audism, and other social issues.

On August 1, 2011, ABC Family announced that they were ordering more episodes for the first season of Switched at Birth, bringing the first season to a total of 30 episodes. The series continued with a winter premiere on January 3, 2012, ending on March 20, 2012, with 12 episodes. The series began airing its remaining 8 episodes for its first season, beginning September 3, 2012.

Cast

Main
 Sean Berdy as Emmett Bledsoe
 Lucas Grabeel as Toby Kennish
 Katie Leclerc as Daphne Paloma Vasquez
 Vanessa Marano as Bay Madeleine Kennish
 Constance Marie as Regina Vasquez
 D. W. Moffett as John Kennish
 Lea Thompson as Kathryn Kennish

Recurring

 Ivonne Coll as Adrianna Vasquez
 Maiara Walsh as Simone Sinclair
 Austin Butler as James "Wilke" Wilkerson III
 Marlee Matlin as Melody Bledsoe
 Gilles Marini as Angelo Sorrento
 Sam Page as Craig Tebbe
 Justin Bruening as Jeff Reycraft
 Christopher Wiehl as Patrick
 Tania Raymonde as Zarra
 Blair Redford as Tyler "Ty" Mendoza
 Meeghan Holaway as Amanda Burke
 Ryan Lane as Travis Barnes
 Brandon Bell as Coach Medlock
 Anthony Natale as Cameron Bledsoe
 Charles Michael Davis as Liam Lupo
 Cassi Thomson as Nikki Papagus
 Carlease Burke as Ms. Rose
 Manish Dayal as Scuba
 Oliver Muirhead as Geraldo
 Jason Brooks as Bruce
 Tammy Townsend as Denise
 Robin Thomas as Dale
 Aaron Todd Kessee as Cheves
 TL Forsberg as Olivia
 Mario Ardila Jr. as Mouse
 Mat Vairo as Alex Rainford
 Tina Huang as Tina Choi
 Steven Connor as Mr. Thatcher
 Natalie Amenula as Monica
 Suanne Spoke as Karen Barnes
 Madison Saager as Heather
 Jackie Debatin as Sarah Lazar
 Meredith Baxter as Bonnie Tamblyn-Dixon
 Marianne Chambers as Leanne Cowley
 Nishi Munshi as Priya
 Justina Machado as Brizia Munos
 Ruth Livier as Margaret

Episodes

Reception

U.S. Ratings

References

2011 American television seasons
2012 American television seasons
Switched at Birth (TV series)